Frederick Fermor-Hesketh, 2nd Baron Hesketh DL (8 April 1916 – 10 June 1955), was a British peer and soldier.

Background and education
Hesketh was the son of Thomas Fermor-Hesketh, 1st Baron Hesketh, and Florence Louise Breckinridge, of Kentucky, daughter of John Witherspoon Breckinridge, and granddaughter of General (CSA) John C. Breckinridge, Vice-President of the United States of America and Secretary of War for the Confederate States of America, in 1909. He was educated from 1926 at Eton and later Magdalene College, Cambridge.

Military service
Hesketh was a major in the Scots Guards. He succeeded in the barony on the death of his father on 20 July 1944. In 1950 he became a Deputy Lieutenant of Northamptonshire.

Family life
On 22 November 1949 he married Christian Mary McEwen (known as Christian Lady Hesketh) (17 July 1929 – 7 April 2006), daughter of Captain Sir John Helias Finnie McEwen and had three children:
 Thomas Alexander (known as Alexander), 3rd Baron Hesketh (b. 28 October 1950)
 Robert (1 November 1951 – 2 Feb 1997, car accident)
 John (15 March 1953 – 2 November 2008)

Hesketh was a collector of top-end books in the early 1950s. The trustees of his will sold some of his books, manuscripts and letters in 2010 at Sotheby's. The four volumes of John James Audubon's Birds of America were bought by renowned London book dealer Michael Tollemache for a record £7,321,250.

Arms

See also
 Easton Neston
 Easton Neston house

References

External links

1916 births
1955 deaths
People educated at Eton College
Alumni of Magdalene College, Cambridge
Barons in the Peerage of the United Kingdom
Scots Guards officers
Deputy Lieutenants of Northamptonshire